Sun Valley High School can refer to:
 Sun Valley High School (Arizona), Mesa, Arizona
 Sun Valley High School (California), Los Angeles, California
 Sun Valley High School (North Carolina), Monroe, North Carolina
 Sun Valley High School (Pennsylvania), Aston, Pennsylvania